The 2012–13 Wichita State Shockers men's basketball team represented Wichita State University in the 2012–13 NCAA Division I men's basketball season. They played their home games at the Charles Koch Arena, which has a capacity of 10,506. They played one home game at Intrust Bank Arena. They were in their 68th season as a member of the Missouri Valley Conference and 107th season overall. They were led by sixth-year head coach Gregg Marshall. They finished the season 30–9, 12–6 in Missouri Valley play to finish in second place. They advanced to the championship game of the Missouri Valley tournament where they lost to Creighton. They received an at-large bid to the 2013 NCAA tournament. They received a 9 seed in the West Region, where they  defeated 8 seed Pittsburgh and 1 seed Gonzaga to advance to the Sweet Sixteen. In the West Region semifinals they defeated 13 seed La Salle and 2 seed Ohio State in the regional finals to be crowned West Region Champions and advance to the Final Four for the second time in school history and first time since 1965. In the Final Four they lost to Louisville.

Roster

Schedule

|-
!colspan=12 style="background:#000; color:#F9D616;"| Exhibition
|-

|-
!colspan=12 style="background:#000; color:#F9D616;"| Regular Season
|-

|-
!colspan=12 style="background:#000; color:#F9D616;"| 2013 Missouri Valley Tournament
|-

|-
!colspan=12 style="background:#000; color:#F9D616;" | 2013 NCAA Tournament

References

External links
 Sports Illustrated readers vote 2013 Wichita State team as Best Cinderella of the Seeding Era

Wichita State Shockers men's basketball seasons
Wichita State
Wichita State
NCAA Division I men's basketball tournament Final Four seasons
Shock
Shock